Odostomia parella is a species of sea snail, a marine gastropod mollusc in the family Pyramidellidae, the pyrams and their allies.

Description
The pale yellow shell has an elongate-conic shape. (The whorls of the protoconch are decollated). The five to seven whorls of the teleoconch are flattened in the middle between the sutures, strongly contracted at the periphery, moderately roundly shouldered at the summit. They are marked by rather strong lines of growth and exceedingly fine, closely spaced, microscopic spiral striations. The sutures are strongly contracted. The periphery and the base of the body whorl are well rounded, the latter slightly inflated, marked like the spire. The aperture is ovate. The posterior angle is acute. The outer lip is thin. The columella is very strongly curved, somewhat revolute, reinforced by the base, and provided with a fold at its insertion.

Description
This species occurs in the Pacific Ocean off the Galapagos Islands.

References

External links
 To USNM Invertebrate Zoology Mollusca Collection
 To USNM Invertebrate Zoology Mollusca Collection
 To USNM Invertebrate Zoology Mollusca Collection
 To World Register of Marine Species

parella
Gastropods described in 1909